Nicolae Neagoe (born August 2, 1941) is a Romanian bobsledder who competed in the late 1960s and early 1970s.

With his driver Ion Panţuru, he won the bronze medal in the two-man event at the 1968 Winter Olympics in Grenoble. As of the 2022 Winter Olympics, this is Romania's only medal at the Winter Olympics.

He was born in Sinaia.

External links
 Bobsleigh two-man Olympic medalists 1932-56 and since 1964 (sports123.com)
 
 

1941 births
Living people
Romanian male bobsledders
Olympic bobsledders of Romania
Bobsledders at the 1968 Winter Olympics
Olympic bronze medalists for Romania
Olympic medalists in bobsleigh
Medalists at the 1968 Winter Olympics